Medley Ridge is a rock ridge that extends northeast from Mount Fleming to the southern margin of Wright Upper Glacier, in Victoria Land, Antarctica. It was named by the Advisory Committee on Antarctic Names (2004) after David Medley, a PHI helicopter mechanic with the United States Antarctic Program in eight consecutive field seasons from 1996 to 1997.

References

Ridges of Victoria Land
McMurdo Dry Valleys